Julia Sheremet (born 8 July 1988) is a Belarusian figure skater. She is the 2006 Belarusian national champion and qualified for the free skate at the 2007 World Junior Championships.

Programs

Competitive highlights

References

External links
 

Belarusian female single skaters
1988 births
Living people
Sportspeople from Tolyatti